Savarabad (also Romanized as Savārābād) is a village in Amanabad Rural District, in the Central District of Arak County, Markazi Province, Iran. At the 2006 census, its population was 762, in 186 families.

References 

Populated places in Arak County